Gargan is a railway station located on the Île-de-France tramway Line 4 in the commune of Les Pavillons-sous-Bois, at the limit of Livry-Gargan.

References

External links
 

Railway stations in France opened in 1875
Railway stations in Seine-Saint-Denis